Mian Muhammad Afzal Hayat (died 3 December 2020) was a Pakistani politician who was an MPA of the Punjab Assembly, he served as the Minister of local government of Punjab, Minister of Education of Punjab, Leader of the opposition of Punjab, Chairman Public Account Committee Punjab, Minister of Law Punjab, Ambassador of Qatar and was Caretaker Chief Minister of Punjab from 1996 to 1997. He was also the president of Acoba in Aitchison College.

He was educated at Forman Christian College and Aitchison College.

Hayat died on 3 December 2020 in his hometown of Kolian Shah Hussain in Kharian Tehsil.

References

Chief Minister of Punjab

2020 deaths
Chief Ministers of Punjab, Pakistan
Year of birth missing
People from Gujrat District
Forman Christian College alumni
Aitchison College alumni